Mercadona is a Spanish supermarket chain. Mercadona has 1,636 stores in all the 17 Spanish regions, Ceuta, Melilla and in Portugal. Mercadona was ranked the 9th most reputable company in the world in 2009, by the Reputation Institute as listed in Forbes magazine.

Francisco Roig Ballester and his wife, Trinidad Alfonso Mocholi, founded the company in 1977, which began as a small butcher shop in Tavernes Blanques, a village in Valencia. Juan Roig assumed the role of CEO in 1981, and the company has since expanded nationwide.  In the 1990s, Juan Roig oversaw a series of changes companywide and revealed the new façade of Mercadona which was able to compete with its French competitor Carrefour and the co-operative Eroski.

History
Since its days as a butcher shop in 1977, Mercadona expanded to eight stores in 1981, and 1,148 stores as of October 2013, with more on the way. The chain has had an online shop since 2001, which accounted for one percent of total sales in 2010. Today it holds 13.5% of Spain's total food retail space and brought in more than €508 million in profits for the 2012 fiscal year.

CEO Juan Roig plans to bring Mercadona to Italy or France but may modify his Spanish model of business to compete in the new markets. He was quoted in the Economist saying, "We must learn everything from everyone".

The Mercadona Management Committee approved in 2016, the start of the expansion in Portugal, the first supermarket in Vila Nova de Gaia opened their doors in July 2019.

Ownership
Juan Roig is the CEO and major shareholder (50%), his wife Hortensia Herrero owns 30%, and his brother Fernando Roig owns 9%. They are all billionaires. There is another partner, Rafael Gómez Gómez, which holds 7% of the company.

Business model
Mercadona dedicates much of its resources to eliminating unnecessary costs in its packaging.  According to the Economist, the chain has saved €2.2 billion by reducing packaging materials.  This included opting out of a glossy finish on packaging which company leaders deemed unnecessary, and adding a plastic lid to a can of tuna, making it easier to open and more appealing to purchase.

Mercadona does not spend capital resources on advertising or marketing campaigns, yet another method of cutting costs.  It instead relies on word of mouth and free social media to promote and maintain its brand.  Their Twitter, Facebook, and YouTube accounts share pictures and videos of products and company practices.

Modern changes
Mercadona was the first Spanish company to use barcodes in its stores. The system has since permitted greater monitoring of product movement in addition to an increase in the speed of customer checkout times. Mercadona also has an automated distribution center on the outskirts of Madrid, where computer monitors keep track of orders while robot arms do all the work.

Revenue

Employees
Mercadona employs more than 90,000 workers, all on permanent contracts.  Upon hire, workers are required to complete four weeks of training.  Employees must also go through twenty additional hours of training each year.  Employees receive salaries above the national average of workers in the grocery store industry and the majority of employees receive a bonus each year. Leaders of Mercadona believe this combination of training and payment creates employees who are dedicated and flexible when it comes to meeting customer needs.  It is also believed to have helped the company to maintain a relatively low level of employee turnover, only 5% in 2012.

Gluten-free products
Gluten-free products were hard to come by in Spain, which prompted Mercadona to create a whole line of gluten-free products at very affordable prices. Mercadona offers over 850 products for the wheat-intolerant. Mercadona has received over 750 comments, suggestions and requests from wheat-intolerant customers and coeliac associations in 2013, and has acted on these by passing them onto distribution companies and food manufacturers, as well as the store's own factories. Mercadona aims to create products that taste as close as possible to their mainstream counterparts while keeping the costs as low as possible. Products for the wheat-intolerant at Mercadona include yogurt, instant potato for making 'tortilla', or Spanish omelet, beans, sauces, hot chocolate powder, snack mixes, sliced bread, and even iced lollies and drinkable sorbets. It is said that the gluten-free movement started in Mercadona when a member of the founding family was diagnosed with coeliac disease.

Customer service
The website caters to speakers of Spanish, Catalan, Galician, Basque.

References

External links

Retail companies established in 1977
Companies based in the Valencian Community
Supermarkets of Spain
Spanish brands
1977 establishments in Spain
Supermarkets
Food retailers
Companies based in Valencia
1977 establishments